The Long Haul is a 1988 Brazilian drama film directed by Paulo Thiago and starring Carlos Alberto Riccelli, Glória Pires and Dean Stockwell. Jorge, a Brazilian truck driver, undertakes a difficult long-distance journey to assist his boss and friend. Its Brazilian title is Jorge, um Brasileiro.

Cast
 Carlos Alberto Riccelli - Jorge 
 Glória Pires - Sandra 
 Dean Stockwell -  Mario 
 Denise Dumont - Fernanda 
 Antônio Grassi - Fefeu 
 Roberto Bonfim - Altair 
 Fábio Junqueira - Fabio 
 Paulo Castelli - Toledo 
 Jackson De Souza - Oliveira 
 Imara Reis - Helena 
 Waldir Onofre - Telmo

References

External links

1982 films
1980s Portuguese-language films
Films directed by Paulo Thiago
1982 drama films
Brazilian drama films